Kalman Menyhart (born 15 July 1955, in Budapest) is a Hungarian football manager and coach and a retired football goalkeeper.

Career
He was the goalkeeper with whom, on 24 May 1980, the Honvéd Budapest F.C won again the Hungarian Championship since 1955. On this day, the Honvéd Budapest F.C. defeated the team of Szekesfehervari MAV Elore ( 2–0 ).  #1 Menyhart, #2 Paroczai, #3 Kocsis, #4 Varga, #5 Nagy, #6 Garaba, #10 Gyimesi, #9 Weimper, #7 Bodonyi, #8 Dajka, #16 Esterhazy, and #11 Kozma was the team composition and Lajos Tichy was the coach.

In January 1983, his arm was broken while playing an exhibition game against Hertha BSC in the Olympic Stadium of Berlin. Due to this unfortunate injury, he wasn't able to play for the Hungarian National Team. He was unable to play for over 300 games and had to sit on the bench until his injury was completely healed.

At age 33, he left Hungary to play in Belgium, became Belgian Citizen, and acquired the Coach - Assistant Coach - Youth Soccer Coach Diplomas from the Federal School of Belgian Royal Union of Football Association.

Honours
 Budapest Honvéd FC
Hungarian League: 1980, 1984, 1985
Hungarian Cup: 1985

References

Budapest Honvéd Online
 Hungarian Football Federation
 Belgian Royal Union of Football Association ( U.R.B.S.F.A )

1955 births
Living people
Hungarian footballers
Hungarian football managers
Association football goalkeepers
Budapesti VSC footballers
Footballers from Budapest
Francs Borains players
20th-century Hungarian people